Jarron Jones (born March 11, 1994) is an American football offensive lineman for the Memphis Showboats of the United States Football League (USFL). He played college football for Notre Dame with his brother Jamir Jones.

Professional career

New York Giants
After going unselected in the 2017 NFL Draft, Jones was signed by the New York Giants as an undrafted free agent. On July 12, 2017, it was stated that the Giants were trying to convert him to offensive tackle. He was eventually cut on September 2, 2017.

Seattle Seahawks
Two days after being released by New York, Jones was signed by the Seattle Seahawks. On September 12, Jones was released from the Seattle Seahawks practice squad along with Kenny Lawler.

Dallas Cowboys
On September 19, 2017, Jones worked out with the Dallas Cowboys along with Caraun Reid, Jake Eldrenkamp, and others. A day later, he was signed to the practice squad. On May 21, 2018, Jones was waived by the Cowboys.

New York Giants (second stint)
On June 11, 2018, Jones was signed by the New York Giants alongside Kenneth Durden.

Tampa Bay Buccaneers
On August 7, 2018, Jones was signed by the Tampa Bay Buccaneers. On September 1, Jones was cut. 11 days later, he was signed to the practice squad. On October 15, Jones was released.

Washington Redskins
On November 6, 2018, Jones was signed by the Washington Redskins. On November 19, he was released.

Detroit Lions
On December 12, 2018, Jones was signed to the practice squad by the Detroit Lions. On December 31, he signed a futures deal with Detroit.

Buffalo Bills
On August 6, 2019, Jones was signed by the Buffalo Bills. He was cut on August 31.

New York Guardians
In October 2019, Jones was drafted by the New York Guardians in the 2020 XFL Draft.

Pittsburgh Steelers
On March 25, 2020, Jones was signed by the Pittsburgh Steelers along with Cavon Walker. On September 5, 2020, he was cut. A day later, Jones was re-signed to the practice squad. He was placed on injured reserve on December 29. On January 4, 2021, Jones was signed to a futures contract. He was waived on July 20.

On October 18, 2021 Jones was suspended 10 games after pleading guilty in domestic violence case.

Tampa Bay Bandits
On March 10, 2022, Jones was drafted by the Tampa Bay Bandits of the United States Football League. On June 16, 2022, it was announced that Jones was selected as the offensive tackle for the inaugural All-USFL team. On June 17, he was transferred to inactive roster.

Memphis Showboats
Jones and all other Tampa Bay Bandits players were all transferred to the Memphis Showboats after it was announced that the Bandits were taking a hiatus and that the Showboats were joining the league.

References

1994 births
Living people
American football offensive linemen
Notre Dame Fighting Irish football players
New York Giants players
Seattle Seahawks players
Dallas Cowboys players
Tampa Bay Buccaneers players
Washington Redskins players
Detroit Lions players
Buffalo Bills players
New York Guardians players
Pittsburgh Steelers players
Tampa Bay Bandits (2022) players